The B. F. Sturtevant Company was a Boston-based manufacturer of fans. It became a leader in the manufacture of industrial air cooling and ventilation systems.

Origins

The company was founded in 1860 in Boston by inventor Benjamin Franklin Sturtevant (1833–1890); the plant was located near the present Government Center area. The company at first manufactured wooden pegs used in shoemaking. The process created much sawdust, and Sturtevant invented a mechanical fan that was effective at keeping the work area sawdust-free. By 1864 Sturtevant was manufacturing the first commercially successful blower, and by 1866 the company employed 50 workers and worked exclusively on making fans.

In 1869 the company introduced the "Sturtevant system," still the basis for much interior heating of buildings. Sturtevant adapted hot blast technology for indoor heating, using ductwork to spread the warmed air.

In 1876 the company moved its plant to the Jamaica Plain neighborhood of Boston, and soon began work with the United States Navy. In 1879, Sturtevant introduced a system for ventilating the hulls of ships. In 1879, Sturtevant supplied the USS Alliance with mechanical draft fans that improved fuel efficiency so much that Navy ships were able to retire their back-up sail systems.

20th century growth

Sturtevant died in 1890 and his son-in-law, Eugene Foss, took over the business. After a 1901 fire, the plant was moved to Hyde Park in 1903, into a new ten-building,  facility designed by Lockwood, Greene & Co. It was now the world's largest manufacturer of electrical fans. The company had expanded into industrial ventilation, heating, air conditioning, dust and fume removal, power, drying and vacuum cleaning. In 1906, Sturtevant installed the first industrial air conditioning system at Walter Baker & Company in Dorchester, and, at a Chicago hotel in 1910, the first residential air conditioning system. They opened a factory in Galt, Ontario in 1913.

Foss left the company in 1909 to run for Governor of Massachusetts, for which he served three one-year terms. By 1917, Foss's personal money problems threatened the company, which was put into receivership with the rest of his assets. The company survived and, flush with World War I contracts, flourished. In 1919 Sturtevant opened a factory in Framingham, followed by one in Camden, New Jersey in 1922, and Berkeley, California in 1923. Sturtevant, Wisconsin was named for the factory works opened there in 1923.

Sturtevant introduced its highly efficient backward-curved Silentvane fans in 1922, which would be used in the ventilation of the Holland Tunnel. Its Inlet Vane Control system, introduced in 1927, adjusted to load requirements, allowing simpler motors and reducing power consumption. In World War II, almost every new United States fighting ship was built with Sturtevant ventilation.

Post-war decline
In 1945, near the end World War II, Sturtevant was taken over by Westinghouse. The new owners reconstructed and modernized the Hyde Park facilities in 1946, but in 1954 Westinghouse moved the air conditioning business to Virginia, and Sturtevant Boston returned to its roots as an industrial fan manufacturer. In 1985 Sturtevant was sold to the South Africa-based American-Davidson, who quickly sold the industrial fan line to Oklahoma-based Acme Engineering & Manufacturing. The international boycotts of South Africa affected American-Davidson, which closed what was left of Sturtevant in 1989.

References

External links
Air Duct & Filter Cleaning
Heating & Air Conditioning Repair

Heating, ventilation, and air conditioning companies
Manufacturing companies established in 1860
1860 establishments in Massachusetts
Manufacturing companies disestablished in 1989
1989 disestablishments in Massachusetts
1945 mergers and acquisitions
Westinghouse Electric Company
1985 mergers and acquisitions